400 Years of the Telescope: A Journey of Science, Technology and Thought is a 2009 American documentary film that was created to coincide with the International Year of Astronomy in 2009. Directed by Kris Koenig, it chronicles the history of the telescope from the time of Galileo and features interviews with leading astrophysicists and cosmologists from around the world, who explain concepts ranging from Galileo's first use of the telescope to view the moons of Jupiter, to the latest discoveries in space, including new ideas about life on other planets and dark energy, a mysterious vacuum energy that is accelerating the expansion of the universe.

Cast

Actors
Han Beekman 
Mavt Steketee 
Stefano Lecci 
Herman Boerman
Irma Hartog 
Hallam Murray
Nils Koenig
Madison Royal

Galileo voices
Stefano Lecci
Francesca Giannini

Production
The film's development team included Donald Goldsmith, a well-known astronomy writer on the Carl Sagan Cosmos team, and Albert Van Helden, a leading authority on the history of the telescope. It was shot on RED Digital Cinema at the world's leading universities and observatories including the European Southern Observatory, Institute for Astronomy, SETI Institute, Space Telescope Science Institute, Anglo-Australian Observatory, and Harvard University. Among the production team's challenges were shooting the Atacama Large Millimeter Array (ALMA) at 5000m on the Atacama Desert. The original score was composed by Mark Slater and recorded by the London Symphony Orchestra at Abbey Road Studios.

Broadcast and release details
400 Years of the Telescope premiered at the 213th meetings of the American Astronomical Society (AAS) in Long Beach, California, on January 6, 2009.
The film was later shown to a national audience by the Public Broadcasting Service (PBS) on April 10, 2009.
It was selected for screening at several film festivals in 2009, including the Jacksonville Film Festival in Jacksonville, Florida and the Urban Suburban Film Festival in Philadelphia.

Awards
30th Annual Telly Awards
Silver - Excellent achievement in videography/cinematography
Bronze (3) - Outstanding achievement in use of animation, copywriting and the documentary over all

SCINEMA 2009
Best Director

2009 W3 Awards
Silver Winner: Website Design (Michael Moretti)

References

External links
 400 Years of the Telescope at PBS
 
 IYA2009 website

Documentary films about the history of science
American documentary films
2009 films
2009 documentary films
Documentary films about outer space
Neil deGrasse Tyson
Telescopes
2000s English-language films
2000s American films